Félix Adrián Banega (born 19 October 1996) is an Argentine professional footballer who plays as a midfielder.

Career
Banega played for Unión y Progreso in his youth career from 2002, before departing in 2005 to join Rosario Central. Eleven years later, on 15 May 2016, he made his senior debut with Rosario Central during an Argentine Primera División draw with Quilmes. He appeared twice in the following season, 2016–17, prior to leaving the club on loan in July 2017. San Martín temporarily signed Banega for the 2017–18 campaign. His first appearance for San Martín arrived against Estudiantes on 28 October.

In April 2019, having terminated his Rosario contract two months early, Banega headed to Chile with Segunda División club A.C. Colina. However, months later, Banega returned to Argentina with Central Norte of Torneo Federal A. He made one appearance, an eight-minute cameo against Defensores de Pronunciamiento on 5 October, before departing at the end of the year.

Career statistics
.

References

External links

1996 births
Living people
People from Rosario, Santa Fe
People from Rosario Department
Sportspeople from Rosario, Santa Fe
Footballers from Rosario, Santa Fe
Argentine footballers
Association football midfielders
Argentine expatriate footballers
Expatriate footballers in Chile
Argentine expatriate sportspeople in Chile
Argentine Primera División players
Segunda División Profesional de Chile players
Torneo Federal A players
Primera Nacional players
Rosario Central footballers
San Martín de San Juan footballers
Deportes Colina footballers
Central Norte players
Independiente Rivadavia footballers